Novoye Bibeyevo is a rural locality (a village) in Malyshevskoye Rural Settlement, Selivanovsky District, Vladimir Oblast, Russia. The population was 10 as of 2010.

Geography 
Novoye Bibeyevo is located on the Ushna River, 36 km southwest of Krasnaya Gorbatka (the district's administrative centre) by road. Staroye Bibeyevo is the nearest rural locality.

References 

Rural localities in Selivanovsky District